The Portage River is a  river in the U.S. state of Michigan, flowing mostly southwesterly through northeast Jackson County.

The Portage River forms the boundary between the townships of Henrietta and Leoni.

Drainage basin 
The Portage River drains all or portions of the following administrative divisions:
 Ingham County
 Bunker Hill Township
 Ingham Township
 Stockbridge Township
 Jackson County
 Blackman Charter Township
 Grass Lake Township
 Henrietta Township
 Leoni Township
 Waterloo Township
 Washtenaw County
 Lyndon Township
 Sylvan Township

Named tributaries 
From the mouth:
 (right) Wildcat Creek
 Brill Lake
 (right) outflow from
 St. John Lake
 Eagle Lake
 Mud Lake
 (left) Batteese Creek
 Batteese Lake
 Hewes Lake
 (left) Orchard Creek
 (left) Cahaogan Creek
 (right) Thornapple Creek
 (left) Pickett Drain
 Standish Lake
 (right) Jacobs Lake Drain
 Jacobs Lake
 (right) outflow from Portage Lake
 Little Portage Lake
 (right) outflow from series of lakes and small streams including
 Locker Lake
 Riley Lake
 Notten Lake
 Lehman Lake
 (left) Honey Creek
 Portage Lake Swamp

References 

Rivers of Michigan
Rivers of Jackson County, Michigan